Park Junghwan (born 11 January 1993) is a South Korean professional Go player of 9-dan rank.

Biography

Early career
Park became a professional Go player in 2006. He won the Fujitsu Cup in 2011. Park defeated Lee Chang-ho to advance to the final of the 2012 Ing Cup, where he faced Fan Tingyu for the title. He lost three games to one. He won the 19th LG Cup in 2015, defeating Kim Ji-seok in the final, 2–1.

2016-2017: Ing Cup runner-up
After a series of strong performances, in which during a span of 2 months he was able to defeat World No.1 Ke Jie in two consecutive international tournaments, namely the LG Cup and the Ing Cup, Park was able to reach the final of the latter, and the round of 8 in the former. Park faced Tang Weixing in the final of the 2016 Ing Cup, with the first two games being played in mid-August. The first 2 games of the Ing Cup were played, with Park winning the first by resignation whilst losing the second. In both games the margin of victory was small, but Park was able to produce a comeback in the second game, with Tang lamenting that he went wrong after the midgame.

Park's most recent results were the Bailing Cup, where despite his best efforts, he was not able to defeat the Chinese Tianyuan holder Chen Yaoye. During that game, both sides opened up securing territory and doing big territorial exchanges, but a slip-up by Park allowed Chen to win an important ko that ultimately led to loss of territory. Chen was then able to capitalize and win the game, thereby ending the Korean player's string of dominance in the international tournaments.

From the 22nd to 26 October 2016, Park contested the final 3 games of the 8th Ing Cup with former World Champion and one of China's highest ranked players, Tang Weixing, with the score standing at 1:1 (after the first 2 games were played in mid August). Despite Park winning the third game, and bringing the score to 2:1 and having 2 chances to win his first Ing Cup after losing the previous edition, Tang came from behind to win once with white (up to game 4 all games had been won by the player with the white stones), and once more with Black (by 5 points, after Ing komi was applied), thereby securing China's third Ing Cup victory out of 8, 2nd behind Korea who has 5. Park, however, was left with bitter disappointment for being the first player to lose 2 back to back Ing cup finals, despite also joining the ranks of a few well known pros of previous generations, such as compatriots Lee Chang-ho and Choi Cheol-han and former World Champion Chang Hao 9p of China, who had also played 2 finals. Incidentally, all 3 players listed above secured victories once over each of their rivals whilst losing to the other, spanning 3 consecutive Ing Cups from the 4th edition to 6th. The record between all of them is 1 Title, 1 runners up.

Park later played in the LG Cup quarterfinals on mid November (14th), where is opponent will be former world champion and 2x LG Cup winner Gu Li 9p. He defeated Gu Li by resign, but subsequently fell to another Chinese player Zhou Ruiyang 9p, thus ending his 2016-17 season.

2017-2018
Park won the 2017 World Go Championship, a special invitational tournament organized by the Nihon Ki-in, defeating Iyama Yuta, Japanese Go program DeepZenGo and Mi Yuting.

Park performed strongly in 3rd Mlily Cup, defeating Tuo Jiaxi, Zhou Ruiyang, Ke Jie, Chen Zijian and Xie Ke. His opponent in the finals will be Park Yeonghun 9p.

Promotion record

Career record

Titles & runners-up

Individual Titles
Ranks #5 in total number of individual titles in Korea and tied for #5 in total number of international titles.

Team Titles

Head-to-head record vs selected players

Players who have won international go titles in bold.

 Chen Yaoye 16:22
 Lee Sedol 14:18
 Park Yeonghun 21:9
 Kim Jiseok 20:6
 Lee Changho 16:7
 Ke Jie 11:10
 Choi Cheolhan 14:6
 Shi Yue 11:9
 Tan Xiao 12:5
 Yun Junsang 9:8
 Cho Hanseung 13:3
 Zhou Ruiyang 11:5
 Tang Weixing 9:7
 Lee Younggu 13:2
 Shin Jinseo 10:5
 Fan Tingyu 8:7
 Kang Dongyun 7:7
 Baek Hongseok 11:2
 Mi Yuting 7:6
 Won Seongjin 7:4
 On Sojin 7:3
 Mok Jinseok 6:4
 Gu Li 5:5
 Hong Seongji 8:1

References

External links
GoGameWorld.com profile
Korea Baduk Association profile (in Korean)

1993 births
Living people
South Korean Go players
Asian Games medalists in go
Go players at the 2010 Asian Games
Asian Games gold medalists for South Korea
Medalists at the 2010 Asian Games